George O'Hara may refer to:

George O'Hara (actor) (1899–1966), American film actor and screenwriter of the silent film era
George O'Hara (pseudonym), alias of Beatles musician George Harrison
George O'Hara (footballer) (1933–2018), Scottish football player (Dundee FC, Queen of the South FC)